Atomic Blonde is a 2017 American action thriller film directed by David Leitch (in his feature directorial debut) from a screenplay by Kurt Johnstad,  based on the 2012 graphic novel The Coldest City by Antony Johnston and Sam Hart. The film stars Charlize Theron (who also served as a co-producer), James McAvoy, John Goodman, Til Schweiger, Eddie Marsan, Sofia Boutella, and Toby Jones. The story revolves around a spy who has to find a list of double agents that is being smuggled into the West on the eve of the collapse of the Berlin Wall in 1989. 

Atomic Blonde premiered at South by Southwest on March 12, 2017, and was released in the United States on July 28, by Focus Features. The film was a box-office hit, grossing $100 million worldwide against a budget of $30 million, and received generally positive reviews from critics. Many compared the film to the John Wick series, for which Leitch was an uncredited co-director and producer of the first film. A sequel is in development.

Plot 
In November 1989, days prior to the collapse of the Berlin Wall, MI6 agent James Gascoigne is shot and killed by KGB agent Yuri Bakhtin, who steals The List, a microfilm document concealed in Gascoigne's wristwatch containing the names of every intelligence agent (on both sides) active in Berlin. Ten days later, Lorraine Broughton, a top-level MI6 spy, is brought in to be debriefed by MI6 executive Eric Gray and CIA agent Emmett Kurzfeld about her just-finished mission to Berlin. The plot jumps between the debriefing room and flashbacks to Lorraine's time in Berlin.

The day after Gascoigne's death, Lorraine is dispatched to recover The List and is told to keep an eye out for Satchel, a double agent for the KGB who has been a problem for MI6 for years. Arriving in Berlin, she is immediately ambushed by KGB agents speaking English and apparently posing as her own MI6 team, who attempt to deliver a message from their boss, Aleksander Bremovych. She is able to escape their grasp by crashing their car and is immediately picked up by her real MI6 contact, maverick MI6 station head David Percival, who should have been the one to pick her up initially. Percival is addicted to the Bohemian lifestyle he has been leading on both sides of the Berlin wall and resentful of Lorraine and the implied supervision from London she brings, and he seems unwilling to cooperate with her. Lorraine searches Gascoigne's apartment and discovers a picture of him and Percival. In the debriefing, she tells Gray and Kurzfeld that Percival had previously denied knowing Gascoigne and she suspects Percival was behind the West Berlin police ambushing her while she searched Gascoigne's apartment. When Lorraine visits a restaurant mentioned by the KGB agents she encounters Bremovych, but is "saved" by Delphine Lasalle, a novice French agent. Although Lorraine is initially suspicious of Lasalle, they eventually enter into a sexual relationship after a passionate kiss in a nightclub, where Lasalle tells Lorraine that she knows who she is and why she's in Berlin, and suggests that they should work together.

Percival, having tailed Lorraine, surveils a watchmaker she visited. He spots Bakhtin entering the same shop. Bakhtin tells the watchmaker he has a watch full of secrets he will sell to the highest bidder. Kurzfeld meets with Lorraine in Berlin, handing her a newspaper containing a number which, when called, informs her Satchel has been compromised. Percival lures Bakhtin to an alley, kills him, and takes the wristwatch  from which he discovers who Satchel is. Lorraine, who does not know Percival has The List, finds out that the Stasi officer codenamed Spyglass, who gave The List to Gascoigne, also memorized the names on it. Lorraine and Percival make plans to escort him across the border to West Berlin. Percival meets with Bremovych, who suspects Percival has The List, but Percival offers only the second best thing—the identity and operations details of Satchel "to keep the balance", also tipping him off about the plan to extricate Spyglass from East Berlin. Lasalle covertly photographs the meeting.

During the extrication of Spyglass, Percival secretly shoots him when the KGB agents are unable to. Lorraine battles multiple KGB agents while rescuing the wounded Spyglass, however, he drowns when their car is pushed into a river by the same KGB agent whose car Lorraine crashed when she first arrived in Berlin. Lorraine makes it to West Berlin and realizes Percival has planted a bug in her coat. She tells Lasalle, who calls Percival and threatens him with her knowledge of his Bremovych meeting. Percival goes to Lasalle's apartment and kills her, fleeing as Lorraine arrives moments later. Lorraine discovers the photographs taken by Lasalle and realizes Percival has read The List. Percival burns his safehouse and attempts to flee, but Lorraine arrives, kills him, avenging Lasalle, and takes The List.

In the MI6 debriefing, Lorraine discovers Percival had told Gray he had The List and he was "very close to Satchel". She presents Lasalle's photographs and doctored audio recordings, which paint Percival as Satchel. She denies knowing The List's whereabouts, leaving MI6 no choice but to close the case.

Three days later in Paris, Lorraine, now speaking in Russian, meets with Bremovych, who addresses her as "Comrade Satchel". Bremovych, having learned from Percival there is more to Satchel than he had previously known, orders his men to kill her. Lorraine kills his henchmen. Then, speaking with an American accent, she tells Bremovych she always fed him misinformation to manipulate the KGB. Then she kills him. She and Kurzfeld (CIA) return to the United States with The List. In their friendly conversation, it is implied Lorraine is actually a triple agent and had been working for the CIA all along.

Cast 

 Charlize Theron as Lorraine Broughton, a top-level MI6 field agent.
 James McAvoy as David Percival, a maverick MI6 Berlin station chief who is assigned to assist Lorraine in her mission.
 John Goodman as Emmett Kurzfeld, a senior CIA agent working with MI6.
 Til Schweiger as The Watchmaker, a mysterious neutral character who crafts special watches hiding codes inside.
 Eddie Marsan as "Spyglass", the Stasi defector who gives the list to Gascoigne.
 Sofia Boutella as Delphine Lasalle, an undercover French agent. 
 Roland Møller as Aleksander Bremovych, a high-ranking Russian KGB operative in Berlin.
 Jóhannes Jóhannesson as Yuri Bakhtin, the rogue KGB agent who kills Gascoigne and steals the list.
 James Faulkner as "C", head of MI6.
 Barbara Sukowa as the coroner, who is in charge of releasing Gascoigne's body to Lorraine.
 Toby Jones as Eric Gray, Lorraine's MI6 superior.

In addition, Sam Hargrave and Bill Skarsgård make brief appearances as MI6 agent James Gascoigne and as Lorraine's East German contact and presumed CIA ally Merkel, respectively. Daniel Bernhardt also played a strong thug working for Bremovych who fights Lorraine several times.

Production 
An adaptation of the graphic novel The Coldest City was announced in May 2015. Described by Variety as a "Passion Project" for Theron, she first came across the story five years prior, when her production company Denver and Delilah Productions was sent the then-unpublished graphic novel. Theron's interest in the first John Wick movie inspired her to get David Leitch, one of the directors, to helm the project. Leitch eventually left John Wick: Chapter 2 to direct the film. According to Theron, the success of Mad Max: Fury Road helped guide the development of Atomic Blonde. The film features a bisexual subplot that was not in the original book. This came from writer Kurt Johnstad, who suggested it after Theron was "thinking about how do you make this different from other spy movies". Leitch has insisted that the scenes are not there to be "provocative", but "more about if you are a spy you will do whatever it takes to get information" and how the main character "find[s] her intimacies and her friendships in small doses".

Theron's casting as the lead was announced in May 2015, while James McAvoy was announced that October. In November, John Goodman was reported as also being in talks to join the film. It was originally hoped that David Bowie would play a part in the film, although he turned down the offer shortly before his death. To prepare for the role, Theron worked with eight personal trainers, who "basically made [her] puke every single day". During the process, Theron cracked her teeth from clenching her jaw and had to get them fixed in surgery. She also bruised a rib during her training. As Theron's training for the movie overlapped with Keanu Reeves' training for John Wick: Chapter 2, the two developed a competitive relationship, which included sparring together.

Principal photography on the film began on November 22, 2015, in Budapest, and later moved to Berlin.

Soundtrack

From the start, Leitch felt that using the right songs for the project was crucial. Part of this was attempting to answer the question "How do you reinvent this stuffy Cold War spy movie?" The soundtrack uses a combination of 1980s songs as well as covers of them. The latter were used to add "a contemporized feeling of the '80s". The movie's producers were initially worried that they would not be able to get the rights to all the songs that Leitch wanted to use, but Leitch himself estimated that around 75% of his picks made it into the final product. Though the Berlin Wall fell in 1989, the concentration of iconic songs was from the first half of the 1980s, with the exception of George Michael's 1988 chart-topping "Father Figure", which itself was Leitch's second choice after the 1986 release "Take My Breath Away" by Berlin.

Track listing
Other songs in the film, but not included in the soundtrack:

Release
In May 2015, Focus Features acquired distribution rights to the film. It was initially scheduled to be released on August 11, 2017, before being moved up to July 28, 2017. The film had its world premiere at the South by Southwest on March 12, 2017.

Reception

Box office
Atomic Blonde grossed $51.7 million in the United States and Canada and $48.3 million in other territories, for a worldwide total of $100 million, against a production budget of $30 million.

In North America, Atomic Blonde was projected to gross around $20 million from 3,304 theaters during its first weekend. It grossed $1.52 million from Thursday night previews at 2,685 theaters. After making $7.1 million on its first day (including previews), the film went on to open to $18.3 million, finishing 4th at the box office, behind Dunkirk, The Emoji Movie and Girls Trip. In its second weekend the film dropped 55% to $8.2 million, finishing 7th at the box office. It made $4.5 million in its third week and $2.2 million in its fourth, finishing 10th and 13th at the box office, respectively.

Critical response
On review aggregation website Rotten Tomatoes, the film has an approval rating of 79% based on 367 reviews, with an average rating of 6.6/10. The website's critical consensus reads, "Atomic Blonde gets enough mileage out of its stylish action sequences – and ever-magnetic star – to make up for a narrative that's somewhat less hard-hitting than its protagonist." On Metacritic, the film has a weighted average score of 63 out of 100, based on reviews from 50 critics, indicating "generally favorable reviews". Audiences polled by CinemaScore gave the film an average grade of "B" on an A+ to F scale.

Richard Roeper of the Chicago Sun-Times gave the film 3.5 out of 4 stars, saying: "Borrow from Bourne and Bond. Rinse and repeat. This is the recipe for the quite ridiculous, ultra-violent and deliriously entertaining Atomic Blonde, a slick vehicle for the magnetic, badass charms of Charlize Theron, who is now officially an A-list action star on the strength of this film and Mad Max: Fury Road." Writing for Rolling Stone, Peter Travers praised the cast and fight scenes, giving it 3 stars out of 4 and saying, "It's the fight scenes that count – and they're astonishingly good, from a mano-a-mano beatdown involving Theron's stiletto heel and a thug's jugular vein to a climactic free-for-all in a swanky hotel suite where 99 Luftballons scores every gunshot and gut-punch."

Jake Coyle of the Associated Press gave the film 2/4 stars, calling it "largely a vacant, hyper-stylistic romp that trades on the thick Cold War atmosphere of far better films".

Future

Sequel
In July 2017, Leitch expressed a desire to develop a sequel film to Atomic Blonde, saying that the project is dependent on the first film's success. In May 2018, Theron confirmed that a sequel was in active development. By July 2019, Leitch announced that the project is in development as a production deal with a streaming service company, while the filmmaker's wife Kelly McCormick, will return as producer. By April 2020, it was announced the film was in development as a Netflix exclusive film, while Theron will also be a producer.

Potential crossover with John Wick
In July 2017, Leitch discussed the potential of a crossover film featuring Atomic Blonde and the John Wick franchise. Leitch directed the former, after previously co-directing the first John Wick film. The filmmaker stated that all individuals involved have discussed the possibility, and that they would do it once there was a good enough story worked out.

References

Further reading

External links
 
 
 Atomic Blonde at Box Office Mojo

2017 films
2017 action thriller films
2017 LGBT-related films
2010s English-language films
2010s spy films
American action thriller films
American LGBT-related films
American spy films
Cold War spy films
Female bisexuality in film
Bisexuality-related films
Lesbian-related films
LGBT-related thriller films
Films about the Berlin Wall
Films based on British comics
Girls with guns films
Live-action films based on comics
Techno-thriller films
Films set in 1989
Films set in Berlin
Films set in London
Films set in Paris
Films shot in Berlin
Films shot in Budapest
Films directed by David Leitch
Films produced by Charlize Theron
Films scored by Tyler Bates
Babelsberg Studio films
Focus Features films
Films with screenplays by Kurt Johnstad
Films based on British novels
2017 directorial debut films
Oni Press adaptations
Films about the Central Intelligence Agency
Films about the Secret Intelligence Service
Films set in East Germany
Films set in West Germany
Films about the Russian Mafia
Films set in a movie theatre
2010s American films